Brock Alan Osweiler (born November 22, 1990) is a former American football quarterback who played in the National Football League (NFL) for seven seasons. He played college football at Arizona State and was selected by the Denver Broncos in the second round of the 2012 NFL Draft. Osweiler first served as the Broncos' starter during their Super Bowl-winning season in 2015 when he relieved an injured Peyton Manning, although Manning resumed his starting duties for the playoffs and eventual Super Bowl 50 victory. After the Super Bowl, Osweiler became the starting quarterback for the Houston Texans, but an unsuccessful 2016 campaign resulted in his tenure lasting only one season. He returned to Denver the following season in a backup role and played his final season as a backup with the Miami Dolphins.

Early years
Born in Coeur d'Alene, Idaho on November 22, 1990, Osweiler was raised by his parents, Kathy and John Osweiler, in Kalispell, Montana. Osweiler attended Flathead High School. Osweiler's older brother, Tanner, played college football in the National Association of Intercollegiate Athletics (NAIA) at Montana Tech in Butte. Their father received scholarship offers to play football at Montana and Montana State but ultimately chose to enter the military out of high school.

Osweiler played both football and basketball; football was the dominant sport in Montana, so Osweiler traveled to neighboring states to play for Amateur Athletic Union (AAU) basketball teams in Portland, Oregon, and Seattle, Yakima, and Spokane, Washington. In 2006, after his freshman year of high school, he committed to Gonzaga University in Spokane to play basketball, but later decided to focus on playing college football. As a senior, he was the 2008–2009 Gatorade Player of the Year in football for Montana after he completed 189 of 303 passes for 2,703 yards and 29 touchdowns; he also rushed for 700 yards on 162 carries with 13 touchdowns.

College career

Osweiler chose to attend Arizona State University over scholarship offers from Stanford and Washington State. As a true freshman in 2009, Osweiler played in six games with one start. He became the first true freshman to start a game for the Sun Devils since Jake Plummer in 1993. He finished the season completing 24 of 55 passes for 249 yards with two touchdowns and two interceptions. As a sophomore in 2010, he again played in six games with one start. For the season he completed 62 of 109 passes for 797 yards, five touchdowns and no interceptions. As a junior in 2011, he took over as the Sun Devils starting quarterback after the retirement of Steven Threet. He finished the season with 4,036 yards and 26 touchdowns.

College statistics

Professional career

Osweiler was rated the sixth best quarterback in the 2012 NFL Draft by NFLDraftScout.com. He measured 6'6 and 7/8 inches tall at the 2012 NFL Combine, instead of the 6'8" that the media had touted throughout his Arizona State career. He scored a 25 on the Wonderlic. He was selected with the 57th overall pick in the second round of the 2012 NFL Draft by the Denver Broncos.

Denver Broncos

2012 season: Rookie year

Osweiler signed a four-year rookie contract worth $3,516,000 through the 2015 season. Osweiler made his NFL debut in Week 4 of the 2012 season against the Oakland Raiders. The Broncos won 37–6. He threw his first pass in a Week 17 victory over the Kansas City Chiefs, completing 2 of 4 passes for 12 yards.

2013 season

In a Week 4 win against the Philadelphia Eagles, Osweiler came in to complete 2 of 3 passes for 10 yards, adding rush yards on two attempts. In a Week 17 win against the Raiders, Osweiler completed 9 of 13 attempts for 85 yards. During the Week 12 overtime loss in the 2013 season, Osweiler was put into the line in an attempt to block the New England Patriots game-winning field-goal, as he was the tallest member of the team at 6'7" (2.01 m) at the time.

2014 season
In a Week 7 win against the San Francisco 49ers, Osweiler attempted one incomplete pass. During a Week 10 41–17 win against the Raiders, Osweiler completed 2 of 5 passes for 13 yards. During the Broncos Week 15 22–10 win against the San Diego Chargers, Osweiler had two incomplete passes. Osweiler threw his first career touchdown against the Raiders on December 28, 2014.

2015 season

Against the Kansas City Chiefs on November 15, 2015, Osweiler took over for Peyton Manning, who was benched after throwing four interceptions and posting a passer rating of 0.0. The Broncos later announced that Osweiler would start in place of the injured Manning the following week against the Chicago Bears. In his first start on his 25th birthday, he completed 20 out of his 27 passes for 250 yards with two touchdowns and a 127.1 passer rating in a 17–15 win over the Bears, becoming the first player to start and win his first career game on his birthday. He was named the AFC Offensive Player of the Week for his performance against the Bears. Osweiler was presented the game ball after the game by head coach Gary Kubiak. The next day, it was announced that Osweiler would start the following week against the New England Patriots. On November 29, 2015, Osweiler led the Broncos to a win over the then-undefeated Patriots in overtime, 30–24. He completed 23 of 42 passes for 270 yards, a touchdown, and an interception. Osweiler started his third consecutive game for the injured Manning during Week 13 against the San Diego Chargers. He finished the game with 16 of 26 completions (61.5%) for 166 passing yards, a touchdown, and an interception. The following week, Osweiler suffered his first loss in a 15–12 defeat to the Oakland Raiders. He capped the game off with a career-high 51 attempts, completing 35 of them for 308 yards.

On December 15, it was announced that Osweiler would start his fifth consecutive game against the Pittsburgh Steelers despite the fact that Manning had returned to practice. During the game Osweiler completed 21 of 44 passes for 296 yards, three touchdowns, and an interception. He also carried the ball 5 times for 19 yards and a seven-yard touchdown, but the Broncos ultimately lost 34–27. In Week 16, Osweiler started his sixth consecutive game against the Cincinnati Bengals, completing 27 of 39 attempts for 299 yards and one touchdown in a 20–17 overtime win. In the Broncos' regular-season finale, on January 3, Osweiler was replaced by Manning in the third quarter after throwing two interceptions and fumbling once. Manning led the Broncos to a 27–20 win over the Chargers and helped the Broncos secure the top seed in the AFC. On January 7, 2016, the team announced Osweiler suffered a low-grade strain to the medial collateral ligament of his right knee during a game against the San Diego Chargers.

Osweiler finished the 2015 season completing 170 completions out of 275 attempts (61.8%) for 1,967 yards for 10 touchdowns and 6 interceptions while having an 86.4 quarterback rating. He also rushed for 61 yards on 21 attempts for an additional touchdown. On February 7, 2016, Osweiler was active as the backup quarterback as the Broncos won Super Bowl 50 over the Carolina Panthers by a score of 24–10.

Houston Texans

On March 9, 2016, Osweiler signed a four-year, $72 million contract ($37 million guaranteed) with the Houston Texans.

In his Texans' debut on September 11, 2016, Osweiler passed for 231 yards, two touchdowns, and an interception in the 23–14 victory over the Chicago Bears. Despite his strong start, he began to struggle as the season progressed. During a Week 7 road game against his former team, the Denver Broncos, Osweiler had a total of three fumbles with one lost as the Texans were defeated 27-9. During Week 12 against the San Diego Chargers, Osweiler threw no touchdowns and three interceptions as the Texans lost 21-13. However, he did contribute a 1-yard rushing touchdown.

During Week 15 against the Jacksonville Jaguars, Osweiler was benched for Tom Savage after throwing back-to-back first-half interceptions. The two interceptions brought his season total to 16, setting a single-season Texans franchise record. Savage was then named the starter for the game against the Cincinnati Bengals. In Week 17, Osweiler entered the game in relief of Savage, who suffered a concussion. Osweiler completed 21 of 40 passes for 253 yards and a touchdown while also rushing for a 1-yard touchdown as the Texans lost to the Tennessee Titans by a score of 24–17. Overall, he finished the 2016 season with 2,957 passing yards, 15 touchdowns, and 16 interceptions.

Due to Savage's injury, Osweiler started the Texans' Wild Card Round playoff game against the Oakland Raiders. During the game, he completed 14 of 25 passes for 168 yards and a touchdown while also rushing for 15 yards and a touchdown as the Texans won 27–14. Shortly after the game, head coach Bill O'Brien announced that Osweiler would remain the team's starter for the Divisional round playoff game against the New England Patriots even though Savage had cleared concussion protocol. In the Divisional round, Osweiler completed 23 of 40 passes for 198 yards, a touchdown, and three interceptions as the Texans lost by a score of 34–16. He also rushed for 18 yards.

Cleveland Browns

On March 9, 2017, Osweiler was traded to the Cleveland Browns along with the Texans' 2017 sixth-round pick and 2018 second-round pick in exchange for the Browns' 2017 fourth-round compensatory pick. This trade was termed by ESPN's Adam Schefter as possibly the most creative trade in NFL history. The move allowed Cleveland to absorb some of Osweiler's cap from Houston in exchange for draft picks, one of the first trades of its kind. On September 2, 2017, Osweiler was released by the Browns after the team named rookie DeShone Kizer as the starter.

Denver Broncos (second stint)
On September 2, 2017, Osweiler signed a one-year contract with the Broncos after backup quarterback Paxton Lynch sustained a shoulder injury. His contract was worth the league-minimum $775,000, leaving the Browns to pay the remaining $15.25 million of Osweiler's $16 million guaranteed.

On November 1, it was announced that Osweiler would start the team's Week 9 game against the Philadelphia Eagles in place of the benched Trevor Siemian.  Osweiler finished the game with 208 passing yards, a touchdown, and 2 interceptions as the Broncos lost 51–23. He then started the team's next two games against the New England Patriots and the Cincinnati Bengals.

On November 21, Osweiler was benched after Lynch was named the team's Week 12 starter. Lynch was injured during his lone start and relieved by Siemian. During Week 15 against the Indianapolis Colts, Siemian was injured and relieved by Osweiler. Osweiler played well, throwing for 194 yards and two touchdowns, en route to leading the Broncos to a 25–13 victory. He rushed 15 yards and a touchdown. Osweiler started in Week 16 against the Washington Redskins. He had 193 passing yards and an interception as the Broncos lost 27–11.

Miami Dolphins
On March 23, 2018, Osweiler signed with the Miami Dolphins, reuniting him with his former Broncos offensive coordinator Adam Gase.

During Week 4 of the 2018 season, Osweiler came into the 38–7 loss to the New England Patriots in relief of Ryan Tannehill and threw a touchdown to Frank Gore in the fourth quarter. Two weeks later, Osweiler was named the starter for the Week 6 game against the Chicago Bears after Tannehill was inactive due to a shoulder injury. Osweiler passed for 380 yards, three touchdowns, and two interceptions and led the Dolphins to a 31–28 overtime victory over the Bears. With the win over the Chicago Bears in week 6, Osweiler improved to a 4-0 career record in overtime games, which is an NFL record winning percentage in overtime NFL games in a career. Osweiler appeared in four games the remainder of the season with two interceptions to no touchdowns. Overall, he finished the 2018 season with 1,247 passing yards, six touchdowns, and four interceptions in seven games.

Retirement
On October 16, 2019, Osweiler announced his retirement from the NFL.

NFL career statistics

Regular season

Postseason

Personal life
Osweiler married Erin Costales in February 2015. The couple have two children.

References

External links

 Arizona State Sun Devils bio
 

1990 births
Living people
American football quarterbacks
Arizona State Sun Devils football players
Denver Broncos players
ESPN people
Houston Texans players
Cleveland Browns players
Miami Dolphins players
People from Kalispell, Montana
People from Coeur d'Alene, Idaho
Players of American football from Idaho
Players of American football from Montana